Julian Fleming (born December 19, 2000) is an American football wide receiver for the Ohio State Buckeyes.

Early life and high school career 
Fleming played high school football at Southern Columbia Area High School. Fleming finished his high school football career with 4,442 receiving yards and 62 receiving touchdowns, both PIAA records. He was a five star recruit coming out of high school and committed to Ohio State University to play college football. Rivals.com named Fleming as the best wide receiver and the 14th best player in the 2020 recruiting class.

College career

References

External links
Ohio State Buckeyes Bio

Living people
Ohio State Buckeyes football players
2000 births